Fayrouz Saad is an American public official and politician. She is the Executive Director of the Office of Global Michigan, and was the first Director of Detroit's Office of Immigrant affairs under Mayor Mike Duggan.

Before serving in that position, Saad was an Obama appointee to the Department of Homeland Security (DHS), where she worked on immigration reform, security issues and economic development programs in the Middle East.
Before her appointment at DHS, Saad worked as a Civic Engagement Coordinator for Arab Community Center for Economic and Social Services' National Network for Arab American Communities (NNAAC). She worked for both the Kerry and Clinton campaigns in the 11th congressional district, as well as that of state representative Gino Polidori.

Saad ran as a Democratic candidate for Michigan's 11th congressional district in the 2018 midterm elections, where she came in fourth place with 19.4 per cent of the votes, losing to former Obama administration chief of staff for the Auto Task Force of the U.S. Treasury Department, Haley Stevens, who obtained 27 per cent of the votes.

Personal life 
Saad was born and brought up in the Arab-majority community of Dearborn, Michigan, as the daughter of Lebanese immigrants who still run a small meat wholesale business in Detroit. In his first Eid-al-Fitr celebration in 2016, US President Barack Obama singled out Saad's parents Aref and Aida Saad for praise citing their successful retail business in Michigan "for paying it forward" by having their daughter Fayrouz Saad work as director for the Office of Immigrant Affairs of Detroit. She graduated from the University of Michigan with a double major in Political Science and Psychology, and in 2014 received a master's from the Harvard Kennedy School of Government where she studied urban policy and economic development.  Saad is currently married to Chris DeRusha who serves as the Federal Chief Information Security Officer of the United States at the Office of Management and Budget (OMB).

Career 
Saad's career spans campaign staffing, community organizing and immigration issues at the local, state and national levels. Between 2004-2008, Saad worked as a field organizer for John Kerry's and Gino Polidori's campaigns.

Her organizing work targeted Arab American community relations, voter registration, civic engagement and advocacy strategies through the National Network for Arab American Communities and the Arab Community Center for Economic and Social Services.  Saad was Vice President of Chicago-based political advocacy firm Cambridge Global Advisors where she worked with the federal government on the implementation of CVE in the Dearborn community.

During her tenure at DHS, in addition to serving as a liaison between governors, mayors and other local elected officials in the office of Intergovernmental Affairs (IGA), she assisted the department in coordinating community relations between Arab, Muslim, Sikh, South Asian and Somali communities and their law enforcement partners on CVE initiatives.

References

External links
Official website

Michigan Democrats
University of Michigan College of Literature, Science, and the Arts alumni
Harvard Kennedy School alumni
Women in Michigan politics
American people of Lebanese descent